Kendricktown is an unincorporated community in Jasper County, Missouri, United States. It is located on Missouri Supplemental Route V, immediately north of the city limits of Carthage and just south of U.S. Route 71. The main road through town is a former alignment of US 71. Kendricktown was founded by Kendrick Snyder.

The community is part of the Joplin, Missouri Metropolitan Statistical Area.

Due to repeated flooding in 2007–2008, Jasper County is attempting to buy out a number of the households in this community. The county plans to raze the buildings and the land will be unavailable for future residences. 

Unincorporated communities in Jasper County, Missouri
Joplin, Missouri, metropolitan area
Unincorporated communities in Missouri